The blackthroated bloodsucker (Complicitus nigrigularis) is a species of lizard within the agamid family, the only species in the genus Complicitus. 

It is found in Borneo.

References 

Agamidae
Reptiles described in 1991
Taxa named by Hidetoshi Ota
Taxa named by Tsutomu Hikida